Montana State Highway 37 (MT 37) is a  state highway in the US state of Montana. It begins in downtown Libby, Montana at US 2 and takes a meandering course northeastwards upstream along the Kootenai River and the eastern shore of Lake Koocanusa before terminating at U.S. Route 93 at the northern end of Eureka, Montana. Previously, MT 37 also followed US 93 from Eureka into Whitefish and turned down what is now MT 40 towards US 2 and Glacier National Park until at least 1942.

Route description

Highway 37 begins at an intersection with U.S. Route 2 in downtown Libby, Montana, and heads northeast. It crosses the BNSF Railway tracks just west of the Libby Amtrak station, and passes the site of the former vermiculite export plant before crossing the Kootenai River and taking a more easterly course. The road follows the river upstream into a narrow, tightly winding canyon, running parallel to the railroad on the opposite bank. It suddenly turns south near the former vermiculite mine and passes by its former processing plant site. Soon, the road turns east again, then crosses the Kootenai once more and abruptly heads north, parting ways with the now southbound railroad. The road starts to gain elevation and, once it passes the eastern abutment of Libby Dam, it follows the eastern shore of Lake Koocanusa, hugging the sides of the former canyon as it winds its way north to Rexford. It bypasses the town to its south as the road turns east, passing over a former railroad alignment a few miles later, before turning east one last time amidst farmland to terminate at U.S. Route 93, at the northern end of Eureka.

Major intersections

See also

References

External links

037